Marco Lorenzi (20 June 1993) is an Italian sprinter (400 m).

Biography
Born in Trento, he has junior national record of the 400 metres with the time of 46.39. After a few seasons, he returned to a decent international level in 2017 in the indoor season, winning his first senior national title and establishing his Personal Best, which also appeared in the top 60 positions of the 400-meter annual Top List .

Personal bests
 400 metres outdoor: 46.39 ( Bressanone, 18 June 2011)
 400 metres indoor: 47.17 ( Ancona, 19 February 2017)

Achievements

National titles
 Italian Athletics Indoor Championships
 400 metres: 2017

See also
List of 2010 Summer Youth Olympics medal winners

References

External links
 
 Athlete profile at All-Athletics.com

1993 births
Italian male sprinters
Living people
Athletes (track and field) at the 2010 Summer Youth Olympics
World Athletics Championships athletes for Italy